The Wadawurrung nation, also called the Wathaurong, Wathaurung, and Wadda Wurrung, are an Aboriginal Australian people living in the area near Melbourne, Geelong and the Bellarine Peninsula in the state of Victoria. They are part of the Kulin alliance. The Wathaurong language was spoken by 25 clans south of the Werribee River and the Bellarine Peninsula to Streatham.  The area they inhabit has been occupied for at least the last 25,000 years.

Language

Wathaurong is a Pama-Nyungan language, belonging to the Kulin sub-branch of the Kulinic language family.

Country

To the east of Geelong their land ran up to Queenscliff, and from the south of Geelong around the Bellarine Peninsula, towards the Otway forests. Its northwestern boundaries lay at Mount Emu and Mount Misery, and extended to Lake Burrumbeet Beaufort and the Ballarat goldfields.

The area they inhabit has been occupied for at least the last 25,000 years, with 140 archaeological sites having been found in the region, indicating significant activity over that period.

Contemporary representation
The Wadawurrung Aboriginal Corporation, a Registered Aboriginal Party since 21 May 2009, represents the traditional owners for the Geelong and Ballarat areas, [1][2]  The Wathaurong Aboriginal Co-operative, based in Geelong, also has a role in managing Wathaurong Cultural Heritage, for example through its ownership of the Wurdi Youang Aboriginal stone arrangement at Mount Rothwell.

History of contact
Coastal clans of the Wathaurong may have had contact with Lieutenant John Murray when he charted Indented Head and named Swan Bay. Matthew Flinders met several Wathaurong when he camped at Indented Head and climbed the You Yangs in May 1802. When Lieutenant David Collins founded the colony at Sullivan Bay, Victoria in October 1803, he sent Lieutenant J. Tuckey to survey and explore Corio Bay which resulted in several Aboriginal people being shot and wounded.

William Buckley, a convict who had escaped from the abortive Sullivan Bay settlement in December 1803, lived with a Victorian Aboriginal group, commonly identified with the Wathaurong. In his reminiscences, Buckley tells of his first meeting with native women. Buckley had taken a spear used to mark a grave for use as a walking stick. The women befriended him after recognising the spear as belonging to a relative who had recently died and invited him back to their camp. The tribe thought he was the resurrected Murrangurk, an important former leader. He was adopted into the horde and lived among them for 32 years, being treated with great affection and respect. Buckley states he was appointed a headman and had often witnessed wars, raids, and blood-feuds. He adds that he frequently settled disputes and disarmed warring groups on the eve of some fight. As a revered spirit, he was banned from participating in tribal wars. According to Buckley, warfare was a central part of life among Aboriginal people in the area.

The European settlement of Wathaurong territory began in earnest from 1835, with a rapid arrival of squatters around the Geelong area and westwards. This European settlement was marked by Aboriginal resistance to the invasion, often by driving off or stealing sheep, which then resulted in conflict and sometimes a massacre of Aboriginal people.

Very few of the reports of the killing of Aboriginal people were acted upon. On the few occasions the matter did reach court, such as the killing of Woolmudgin on 7 October 1836, following which John Whitehead was sent to Sydney for trial, the case was dropped for lack of evidence and the absconding of key witness Frederick Taylor. At the time Aboriginal people were denied the right to give evidence in courts of law. The incidents listed below are just those cases that have been reported; it is likely other incidents occurred that were never documented officially. Writing on 9 December 1839, Niel Black, a squatter in western Victoria, describes the prevailing attitude of many settlers:

The best way [to procure a run] is to go outside and take up a new run, provided the conscience of the party is sufficiently seared to enable him without remorse to slaughter natives right and left. It is universally and distinctly understood that the chances are very small indeed of a person taking up a new run being able to maintain possession of his place and property without having recourse to such means – sometimes by wholesale....

In 1841, Wathaurong man Bonjon (or "Bon Jon") was charged with murder for killing Yammowing of the Gulidjan people whose territory bordered that of the Wathaurong. According to the Wesleyan missionary Francis Tuckfield, Bonjon had been in contact with Europeans more than any other member of the Wathaurong, having been attached to the Border Police for some time. According to the local head of that force, Captain Foster Fyans, Bonjon was with him and his troopers for 4 years, tracking down and assisting in armed confrontations with Aboriginal insurgents in the districts to the west. The prosecution alleged that on or about 14 July 1841, Bonjon shot Yammowing in the head with a carbine at Geelong, killing him. The prosecution ultimately abandoned the case and Bonjon was eventually discharged. The case in the Supreme Court of New South Wales for the District of Port Phillip, R v Bonjon, later become notable for the legal question of whether the colonial courts had jurisdiction over offences committed by Aboriginal people inter se, that is, by one Aboriginal person against another, and the legal situation as to the British acquisition of sovereignty over Australia, and its consequences for the Aboriginal people.

The events of the 1854 Eureka Rebellion took place on Wathaurong land. Three Wathaurong clans lived in the vicinity of the Eureka diggings: the Burrumbeet baluk at Lakes Burrumbeet and Learmonth, Keyeet baluk, a sub-group of the Burrumbeet baluk, at Mt Buninyong, and the Tooloora baluk, at Mt Warranheip and Lal Lal Creek.

The early policing of the Ballarat Goldfields was done by the Native Police Corps, who enforced the collection of the gold miners licence fee resulting in confrontations between diggers and the Gold Commissioner, considered by some historians, such as Michael Cannon and Weston Bate, as preludes to the Eureka Rebellion.

There is oral history that local Aboriginal people may have looked after some of the children of the Eureka miners after the military storming of the Eureka Stockade and subsequent massacre of miners. Although not corroborated by any written sources, the account has been deemed plausible by historian Ian D. Clark.

Some further credence, although circumstantial, may be provided to the above information. George Yuille, older brother of William Cross Yuille, was not only liked and trusted by the local Aboriginal people, but had also formed a relationship with one of their women. Together they had at least one child, also named George Yuille. George Yuille senior died on 26 March 1854. He was at the time of his death a storekeeper on Specimen Hill and hence he was among the miners. Whether his wife was with him is unknown, but it is a fair assumption that the local Aboriginal people would have been very familiar with the miners, especially if they were in constant contact with George Yuille.

One Learmonth brother in particular was implicitly aware his shepherds were using skulls of Wadawurrung people on stakes to ward people off his property.

Willem Baa Nip was the last surviving member of the Wathaurong to witness colonisation. A number of prominent Wathaurong people from the early colonial period, including Baa Nip, are buried in the north-west corner of the Western Cemetery in Geelong.

Historical land use and customs
Communities consisted of 25 land-owning groups called clans that spoke a related language and were connected through cultural and mutual interests, totems, trading initiatives and marriage ties. Access to land and resources by other clans, was sometimes restricted depending on the state of the resource in question. For example; if a river or creek had been fished regularly throughout the fishing season and fish supplies were down, fishing was limited or stopped entirely by the clan who owned that resource until fish were given a chance to recover. During this time other resources were utilised for food. This ensured the sustained use of the resources available to them. As with most other Kulin territories, penalties such as spearings were enforced upon trespassers. Today, traditional clan locations, language groups and borders are no longer in use and descendants of Wathaurong people live within modern day society, although still preserving much of their culture.

According to William Buckley, the Wathaurong practised ritual cannibalism, moderately compared to what he reported of the practices of a neighbouring tribe, the Pallidurgbarran, whose putative cannibalism is itself dubious. Buckley claimed enemies slain in combat were roasted and eaten.

Clans
Before European settlement, 25 separate clans existed, each with a clan headman, who was called a n'arweet among the coastal Wathaurong and a nourenit among the inland northern tribe. N'arweet held the same tribal standing as a ngurungaeta of the Wurundjeri people.

Alternative names
 Bengali (horde near Geelong)
 Borumbeet Bulluk (horde at Lake Burrambeet speaking a slight dialect)
 Buninyong (place name, location of a northern horde)
 Waddorow, Wadawio, Wadourer, Woddowrong, Wollowurong, Woddowro, Wudjawuru, Witowurrung, Wothowurong, Watorrong
 Wadjawuru, Wuddyawurru, Wuddyawurra, Witouro, Wittyawhuurong
 Wadthaurung, Waitowrung, Wudthaurung, Woddowrong
 Warra, Wardy-yallock (horde in the Pitfield area)
 Witaoro
 Witowro, Witoura
 Wudja-wurung, Witowurung, Witowurong

Source:

Notes

Citations

Sources

Aboriginal peoples of Victoria (Australia)
Kulin nation
People from Geelong
Port Phillip